Ricardo Mello was the last champion of the event in 2011, but decided not to compete.
João Souza won the title 7–6(7–0), 6–3 against Alejandro González

Seeds

Draw

Finals

Top half

Bottom half

References
 Main Draw
 Qualifying Draw

Aberto Rio Preto - Singles